Out There is a science fiction television program that was broadcast on Sundays at 6:00 p.m. EST on CBS Television from October 28, 1951 through January 13, 1952. It was one of the first science fiction anthology series, and one of the first shows to mix filmed special effects with live action. It only lasted twelve half-hour episodes before being cancelled. The awkward time slot may have led to its failure. In its short run, the program featured episodes adapted from stories by (and in some cases written by) authors including Robert A. Heinlein, Ray Bradbury, Theodore Sturgeon, John D. MacDonald, Murray Leinster, Frank Belknap Long and Milton Lesser. After its initial cancellation, there was at least one report that the network planned on reviving it, but this did not happen.

Donald Davis produced the program.

Episode list

Guest stars
Actors appearing in the series included:
Ray Danton
John Ericson
Eileen Heckart
Bethel Leslie
Leslie Nielsen
Kim Stanley
Rod Steiger
Robert Webber

References

External links

1951 American television series debuts
1952 American television series endings
1950s American science fiction television series
1950s American anthology television series
Black-and-white American television shows
CBS original programming
Science fiction anthology television series